Alfred Norman may refer to:

 Alfred Merle Norman (1831–1918), English clergyman and naturalist
 Alfred Norman (cricketer) (1885–1963), New Zealand cricketer